Zhang Changhong (born 14 February 2000) is a Chinese sport shooter.

He participated at the 2018 ISSF World Shooting Championships, winning a bronze medal.

He qualified to represent China at the 2020 Summer Olympics, winning the gold medal in the 50 m rifle 3 positions category, where he also set a new world record for the event.

References

External links

2000 births
Living people
Chinese male sport shooters
ISSF rifle shooters
Sportspeople from Shandong
Olympic shooters of China
Shooters at the 2018 Summer Youth Olympics
Shooters at the 2020 Summer Olympics
Medalists at the 2020 Summer Olympics
Olympic medalists in shooting
Olympic gold medalists for China
21st-century Chinese people